The 2023 FairBreak Invitational T20 is a women's Twenty20 cricket competition due to be held from 3 to 16 April 2023 at the Kowloon Cricket Club in Hong Kong. The tournament, sanctioned by the ICC, will be privately run by FairBreak Global, a company that aims to promote gender equality. A total of 90 players from 36 countries will be spread across six teams.

An additional tournament for 2023, staged in collaboration with USA Cricket, will be played in Houston, Texas, USA, between 15 and 30 September 2023.

References

Further reading

 

FairBreak Invitational T20
FairBreak Invitational T20 Hong Kong
Cricket in Hong Kong